The Hoosier Open was a golf tournament on the LPGA Tour from 1959 to 1960. It was played at the Fort Wayne Country Club in Fort Wayne, Indiana. Only the 1959 event was an official event.

Winners
Hoosier Celebrity
1960 Joyce Ziske

Hoosier Open
1959 Marlene Hagge

References

Former LPGA Tour events
Golf in Indiana
Sports in Fort Wayne, Indiana
History of women in Indiana